Dr. W. Lawrence S. Prabhakar, M.A (Madras Christian College), Ph.D. (University of Madras) is an Associate Professor of Strategic Studies and International Relations in the department of Political Science at Madras Christian College, India and Adjunct Research Fellow, S.Rajaratnam School of International Studies (Formerly Institute of Defence and Strategic Studies), Nanyang Technological University, Singapore.

Dr. Prabhakar specializes in academic and policy research on the following areas: Nuclear Missile issues in Southern Asia; on Maritime Security issues in the Indian Ocean and the Asia-Pacific Region and on research in India-United States Strategic Relations; Grand Strategy of India and Grand Strategy of China. His primary interest on Nuclear weapons have featured in his projects with Henry Stimson Center, Washington DC USA; Center for Strategic and International Studies, Washington DC USA and with the Institut de Relations Internationales et Stratégiques, Paris, France.

Dr. Prabhakar is a visiting professor at the Department of Geopolitics, Manipal University, Manipal and Member of the Constituting Committee and Board of Research and Studies of the department Manipal University, Manipal, India. He is Media Commentator on Asia-Pacific Strategic Issues, BBC World Service, London, UK and has been consulted on several projects by the Net Assessment Directorate, Chiefs of Staff Committee Ministry of Defence, Govt. of India with principal authorship in the following projects:

- The Role of the Dragon: Strategic Role and Posture of China in the India-Pakistan Conflict Spectrum” in the Simulation-cum-Scenario Development Exercise: India-Pakistan Conflict Spectrum Under the Nuclear Backdrop at the Army War College, Mhow Feb 2003;

- Extra-regional Naval Presence and Posture: Implications for the Indian Navy in the Project Regional Maritime Balance in Indian Ocean 2020;

- Escalation Dynamics Based on Nuclear Doctrines and Force Postures in Southern Asia (March 2004).

His earlier research fellowships have been at the Center for Political Studies, Institute of Social Research, University of Michigan Ann Arbor Visiting Fellow, The Henry Stimson Center, Washington DC USA, where he worked on "The Draft Indian Nuclear Doctrine: Perspectives of Regional & Global Nuclear Powers" May–August 2001 ;In this stint he also worked on "Indian Security Perspectives of the PLA Navy in South Asia" for the Center for Naval Analysis, Alexandria Virginia USA.. He had been on fellowships to the Center for Strategic and International Studies, Washington DC and the Asia-Pacific Center for Security Studies, Honolulu, Hawaii.

He is a Founding Member and Founding Member-Secretary, Centre for Security Analysis, Chennai, an Independent Non-profit, Nonpartisan, policy research think tank based in Chennai, India.

Books 
Maritime Security in the Indian Ocean Region: Critical Issues of Debate

Edited Volumes 
The Maritime Balance of Power in the Asia-Pacific: Maritime Doctrines and Nuclear Weapons At Sea

References

External links 
Biography at Madras Christian College
Biography at Center for Security Analysis website

People from Kanyakumari district
Scientists from Tamil Nadu
Indian political scientists
1950 births
Living people
Indian political writers
Madras Christian College alumni
University of Madras alumni
Manipal Academy of Higher Education alumni
University of Michigan fellows